Rising Star is an Indian version of the international franchise series Rising Star, a reality television singing competition.

The program format lets the viewers vote for contestants live via the television channel's mobile app. The show premiered on 4 February 2015 on Colors TV and airs on weekends at 9:00 pm. This is the first reality television show in India which involves Live Audience Voting.

Popular playback singer and music director Shankar Mahadevan, playback singer and actor Monali Thakur and actor-singer Diljit Dosanjh are the experts in the show. This show marks as Diljit Dosanjh's television debut. The show is hosted by singer-actor Meiyang Chang and dancer-choreographer Raghav Juyal.

Bannet Dosanjh became India's first Rising Star, won Rs. 20 lakhs and also an opportunity to sing a song in an upcoming Vishesh Films movie. Maithili Thakur was declared as the first runner-up.

Season Overview

The Live Auditions
The Live auditions began on 4 February 2017 and lasted for 8 episodes.

 **An exception was made in the final two audition episodes wherein the wall was raised only if the contestant managed to get at least 90% votes. This modification was made since most of the top contestants who had already qualified for the next round had scored more than 90%. Judges made an exception for two contestants Jidnesh Vaze & Deepesh Bhati and gave them a second chance to participate in the Duels Ki Takkar round.

Duels Ki Takkar
The top 30 scorers from the auditions moved on to the second round named 'Duels Ki Takkar' which began on 4 March 2017. The contestants who qualify from this round move on to the quarterfinals.

Episode 9: 4 March 2017

Episode 10: 5 March 2017

Episode 11: 11 March 2017

Episode 12: 12 March 2017

India's Favourite 16
The top 16 contestants compete in this round. As the round progresses, the contestant who receives fewer votes at that point of the competition moves to the Red Sofa. At the end of the episode, the contestant who sits on the Red Sofa gets eliminated.

Episode 13: 18 March 2017

Episode 14: 19 March 2017

Duets Challenge
The top 14 contestants compete in this round. On day one, four teams of two perform in duets. The first two teams perform with the wall up and set the target percentage. The next two teams perform with the wall down and attempt to beat the target score. The duos with the two least scores move to the Red Sofa (unsafe zone). These two teams compete in a face off. The team which loses in the face off gets eliminated.

Episode 15: 25 March 2017

Duets Face Off Round

The bottom two teams perform in the face off round. The team to perform first will set a target percentage. The second team has a challenge to perform better, raise the wall and save themselves.

Episode 16: 26 March 2017

Duets Face Off Round

The bottom two teams perform in the face off round. The team to perform first will set a target percentage. The second team has a challenge to perform better, raise the wall and save themselves.

Remix with DJ Chetas
The top 10 contestants compete in this round where they sing live to the tunes played by DJ Chetas.

Episode 17: 1 April 2017

Dil Se
The top 9 contestants sing a dedication to their loved ones.

Episode 18: 2 April 2017

Regional / Devotional 
The top 8 contestants sing a devotional song or a song in their regional language.

Episode 19: 8 April 2017

Retro Night 
The top 7 contestants sang Hindi songs from the 1970s popularly known as the Retro era.

Episode 20: 9 April 2017

Ticket To Finale 
The contestants compete to earn a direct entry to the finale week.

Episode 21: 15 April 2017

Episode 22: 16 April 2017

Face-off for the Ticket to Finale

The two top scorers of Saturday and Sunday episode participate in a face-off round. In this round, the judges score of 21% will be given in whole to only one contestant who, according to them, performed better.

Finale Week 
Episode 23: 22 April 2017

The top 4 contestants sing duets along with playback singers Master Saleem, Neha Bhasin, Akriti Kakar & Jubin Nautiyal.

Finalist Maithili Thakur gave a guest performance along with Jubin Nautiyal and sang the song Bawra Mann.

Takkar

The two bottom scorers of the episode participate in a face-off round. In this round, the collective judges score of 21% will be given to only one contestant who, according to them, performed better.

Episode 24: 23 April 2017

The top 3 finalists Maithili Thakur, Bannet Dosanjh and Ankita Kundu compete in the first round. Each expert has 1% vote each as opposed to 7%. The top 2 contestants proceed to the Face-off round. 

Face-off

The top 2 scorers of the episode participate in a face-off round. In this round, the experts have no voting power and the votes accumulated are only from the audience.

References

2017 Indian television seasons
Rising Star (Indian TV series)